The Saraswati Shloka is a Hindu prayer. It is traditionally chanted by a student before their commencement of studies. It is addressed to Saraswati, the Hindu goddess of learning and knowledge.

Hymn 
The hymn is composed of the following two verses:

O Saraswati; salutations to you; you who offers boons; you who takes the form of desires. As I begin my studies, may there always be accomplishment for me.

Variations 

Variations of this shloka include:

1.
sarasvatī namastubhyaṃ
varade jñānarūpiṇī
vidyārambhaṃ kariṣyāmi
vinayatbhavatu me sadā

2.
sarasvatī namastubhyaṃ
varade vijñānarūpiṇī
vidyārambhaṃ kariṣyāmi
vinayatbhavatu me sadā

3.
sarasvatī namastubhyaṃ
varade jñānavijñānarūpiṇī
vidyārambhaṃ kariṣyāmi
vinayatbhavatu me sadā

See also
 Saraswati Vandana Mantra
 Trikaranasuddhi

References 

Hindu mantras